Ali Reza Gerdab (also Romanized as ʿAlī Rez̤ā Gerdāb) is a village in Vahdat Rural District, Mugarmun District, Landeh County, Kohgiluyeh and Boyer-Ahmad Province, Iran. At the 2006 census, its population was 94, in 17 families.

References 

Populated places in Landeh County